Cappelen Damm AS is a Norwegian publisher established in 2007. The present company resulted from the merger of J.W. Cappelens Forlag, founded in 1829, and N.W. Damm & Søn, founded in 1843. Cappelen Damm is jointly owned by the Bonnier Group and Egmont.

References

External links
 

Publishing companies of Norway
Norwegian companies established in 2007